The Laughing Frog  is a 2002 Japanese film directed by Hideyuki Hirayama.

Laughing frog may also refer to:

 Jamaican laughing frog, a frog endemic to Jamaica
 Laughing tree frog, a frog found in Australia
 Northern laughing tree frog, a frog native to northern Australia
 Southern laughing tree frog, a frog native to eastern Australia
 Marsh frog, whose Latin name (Pelophylax ridibundus) translates as "laughing water frog"